William Weldon Higgins (June 9, 1888 – April 19, 1937) was an American vaudeville entertainer, comedian, singer and songwriter — critically acclaimed, and is historically chronicled, as one of the most popular stage comedians of the 1920s. Langston Hughes named him as one of the "Golden Dozen" black comedians. On various recordings of the 1920s, Higgins used the pseudonym Jazz Caspar (aka Casper).

Biography

Early years 
Higgins was born in Columbia, South Carolina.  He was African American and often worked in blackface. He began his career in 1912 as a singer of ballads at private clubs in is hometown of Columbia.  Before that, he had been a machinist.  Sometime around 1913, he joined Billy King, a widely popular comedian and producer of touring theatrical revues.  Higgins co-starred with King in the show Two Bills from Alaska.  Higgins performed with King until 1917, when he entered the U.S. Army during World War I.

Service in the United States Army 
During World War I, Higgins was assigned to the 805th Pioneer Infantry, an African American regiment of 2,810 men comprising 14 companies and a medical detachment.  The regiment was nicknamed "Bearcats".  Higgins quickly established himself as a performer at Camp Funston's Detention Camp No. 2, where he was first assigned, and where all new recruits were sent to be cleared by Army medics of any communicable viruses or diseases.  The Bearcat Entertainers were assigned to Headquarters Company.  The 805th Pioneer Infantry was assigned to Europe to support the Meuse-Argonne Offensive, which began September 26, 1918.  The organization participated for  days — from October 3, 1918, to November 11, 1918 — when the Armistice was signed.

When the Bearcats were deployed to Europe, Higgins was chief entertainer for the 14-day trip — which included a stay at Camp Upton, New York, and a Transatlantic crossing aboard the Saxonia.  In Europe, the Bearcats were stationed at Chatel-Chéhéry.  Early on, after arriving, they organized a regimental show and entertained guest of the 805th Pioneer Infantry, among whom included the Congressional Committee on Military Affairs, the Staff College of the American Expeditionary Forces, and several other visitors of high rank.  Lieutenant Leonce Raoul Legendre (1895–1951), of the Headquarters Company, was in charge of the show and the band that, together, comprised the Bearcat Entertainers.  But, Higgins was the de facto stage director.  He gained popularity singing songs such as:

 "Shootin' Cross the Rhine"
 "Somewhere Between Here and Yonder"
 "There's a Great Day Coming When You Lay That Gang Plank Down"
 "Bull Frog Hop"
 "Oh! Doc, Then I'll Go With You"
 "You'll Find Old Dixieland in France"
 "There's Lump of Sugar Down in Dixie"
 "And Everything"
 "Somebody's Done Me Wrong"

Extant lyrics 

Higgins rose to the rank of color sergeant.  He was not deployed to the combat zones of European theater of World War I. After the Armistice of 11 November 1918 was signed, Higgins mustered out of the Army receiving an honorable discharge July 5, 1919.

Post World War I 
After returning to the US at the end of World War I, Higgins joined the Loew touring circuit, Quintard Gailor Miller's (1895-1979) company, and then the Coleman Brothers' Creole Follies, which opened in 1922 at the Lafayette Theatre in Harlem.  Higgins was then recruited by Marcus Levy to take the lead comic role in the 1923 New York show Gold Dust.  In 1924, he starred in the revue Cotton Land, with music by James P. Johnson; and in 1929 he appeared in Hot Chocolates, with Louis Armstrong and music by Fats Waller.  One of his last shows was The Man From Baltimore in 1934.

Song writing and recording 
Higgins also wrote popular songs, including "There'll Be Some Changes Made", "Early in the Morning", and "Georgia Blues", chiefly collaborating with composer Benton Overstreet.  In the 1920s, he recorded several duets with female blues singers, namely Josie Miles, Viola McCoy, Kitty Brown, and Alberta Perkins.

The liner notes on a 1996 2-CD compilation of Josie Miles characterized Higgins' lyrics — singing "A to Z Blues" in a duet recorded in 1924 with Miles — as "a violently bizarre, sadistic  of psychological, and economic domination":

Family 
 Wives
Around February 1924, Higgins married musician and entertainer Valaida Snow (1904–1956), her second of five marriages. Snow had joined the show Follow Me on tour in 1923 as mistress of ceremonies. Israel M. Weingarden (1869–1928) was the producer; Jerry Mills was the stage director.  It was a new production. Other stars in the show included Higgins (principal comedy role), Clifford Ross (born 1879) (supporting comedy role), Julia Moody, Alice Gorgas (1883–1951), and Ernest Whitman.  Their marriage ended and on February 19, 1925, Snow married jazz trumpeter and singer Russell T. "Pops" Smith (de) (1891–1966) in Mason City, Iowa.

Higgins married Ida Stern November 24, 1924, in Manhattan, New York.

 Death
When Higgins died on April 19, 1937, he had been living at 204 West 119th Street, Manhattan, New York.  During the last two years of his life, he had been in poor health and, for that reason, he had been mostly retired from stage-work.  An obituary in the New York Age reported that he was married when he died, but separated.  He was buried with military honors at the Long Island National Cemetery in Suffolk County, Section G, Site 5004.

Ida Higgins was identified as the wife of Billy Higgins in a filing for a copyright renewal of "There'll Be Some Changes Made" in 1942.  Rebecca McCollough, whose relationship to Higgins is not known, also filed for a copyright renewal of "There'll Be Some Changes Made" in 1942.

 Daughter
Higgins had a daughter, Mary Ann Booker (born December 6, 1931).  Higgins was not married to the mother.  The existence of Mary Ann Booker was not widely known by the public until 1960, when Jerry Vogel Music Co., Inc., served notice of an assignment of the copyright renewal rights it had obtained from her in 1958 for $500.  This was a surprise, given that, in the late 1940s, Ida Higgins, Henderson, and Overstreet's next-of-kin had assigned their interests in the renewal rights to Edward B. Marks Corporation, which received a copyright renewal certificate on October 12, 1950.  The matter became more confusing when, on May 20, 1968, the Supreme Court ruled on a different kind of case that seemingly diminished the standing of an "illegitimate child" as an heir to rights and title under an estate. A court case ensued in 1969 between Vogel (plaintiff) and Marks (defendant) in the U.S. Court of Appeals for the Second Circuit.

Selected works 

"There'll Be Some Changes Made (1921)
Billy Wiggins (pseudonym of Billy Higgins) (lyrics)
William Belton Overstreet (music) (1888–1939)
New York: Edward B. Marks Music Corp.
© 16 September 1921 E519207; © Renewal 20 September 1948 R38135 (Henderson arr.)
© 16 September 1921 E519207; © Renewal 17 September 1948 R38310 (Henderson arr.)
© 16 December 1924 E603539; © Renewal 10 December 1951 R87328 (Wheeler arr.)
 5 additional choruses by Wilson & Ringle
© 20 November 1924 E601555; © Renewal 10 December 1951 R87327 (Wilson & Ringle arrangement)
© 20 November 1924 E601555; © Renewal 20 November 1951 R86297 (Wilson & Ringle arrangement)

"Next Man That Falls For Me, I'm Gonna Let Him Lay"
Billy Weldon Higgins (words & music)
© 1st copy 19 September 1924 E597569
New York: Clarence Williams Music Pub. Co., Inc.

"Early in the Morning"
Billy Wiggins (lyrics)
William Belton Overstreet (music) (1888–1939)

"Come Back To Me, Daddy, Momma Ain't Satisfied Blues"
Billy Weldon Higgins (words & music)
© 6 February 1924 E581296
© 1st copy 1 July 1924 E589658
New York: Clarence Williams Music Pub. Co., Inc.

Selected discography

Pseudonyms 
 Billy Wiggins (1921) (see 1948 copyright renewal)
 Jazz Casper (aka Caspar) (notably as vocal accompanist on recordings with Kitty Brown, Alberta Perkins, Josie Miles

 Note: Some biographical references, notably, the searchable BMI Song Database, incorrectly identify Higgins of this article as William Blackstone.  "Blackstone" is the maiden name of the mother of another Billy Higgins (1936–2001) — the late jazz drummer who has no apparent direct relationship to the Higgins of this article.  The mother's full maiden name was Anna Bell Marie Blackstone (1903–2001).  She was married to Samuel Higgins (1901–1970).

References
 Notes

 Catalog of Copyright Entries, Part 3 Musical Compositions, New Series, Library of Congress, Copyright Office
 Original copyrights

 Catalog of Copyright Entries, Third Series, Renewal Registrations-Music, Library of Congress, Copyright Office
 Copyright renewals

 Inline citations

 Links to sheet music (public domain; copyrights expired)

1888 births
1937 deaths
Vaudeville performers
Musicians from Columbia, South Carolina